Bakhodur Kadarov is a Tajikistani wrestler who participated at the 2010 Summer Youth Olympics in Singapore. He won the silver medal in the boys' freestyle 63 kg event, losing to Azamatbi Pshnatlov of Russia in the final.

References 

Wrestlers at the 2010 Summer Youth Olympics
Tajikistani male sport wrestlers
Living people
Wrestlers at the 2014 Asian Games
Wrestlers at the 2018 Asian Games
Year of birth missing (living people)
Asian Games competitors for Tajikistan